Marcel Lenz (born 3 May 1991) is a German footballer for SSVg Velbert.

Career
For the 2017–178 season he moved to Rot-Weiss Essen.

Lenz has represented the German youth national teams on various occasions, most recently at the U19 level.

References

External links

1991 births
Living people
Footballers from Duisburg
German footballers
Germany youth international footballers
Association football goalkeepers
MSV Duisburg players
MSV Duisburg II players
Rot-Weiss Essen players
Schwarz-Weiß Essen players
SSVg Velbert players
3. Liga players
2. Bundesliga players
Regionalliga players
Oberliga (football) players